Mauricio Echazú Puente (born January 2, 1989) is an inactive Peruvian tennis player nicknamed "Garrita" ("Little Claw") because of his grinding playing style and fight spirit.
He is a regular member of the Peruvian Davis Cup team.

Personal Info
In August 2021, Mauricio has been provisionally suspended from the sport by International Tennis Integrity Agency (ITIA): from 6 August 2021, the player is prohibited from competing in or attending any sanctioned tennis events organised by the governing bodies of the sport due to match fixing investigations.

Early career

2004 
At fifteen years old, was selected to Peruvian Davis Cup team to play against Brazil, in Brasilia, for Americas Zone Group I play-off tie. Lost to Brazilian Leonardo Kirche 2–6, 1–6 on clay in his first Davis cup match ever.

2005 
Once again was selected to Peruvian Davis Cup team to play against Paraguayan Davis Cup team, in Lima, for Americas Zone Group I play-off tie. Won to Paraguayan Enzo Pigola 6–4, 6–4 on clay.

Professional tennis career

2006 
Started to play satellite and futures tournaments to win his first ATP points. In Venezuela 1 Satellite Week 1 played on hard surface, qualified for first time to a main draw by winning 3 matches of qualifying draw. Although, lost to Brazilian Ricardo Hocevar 2–6, 7–6(2), 3–6 in 1st round. In the next weeks, qualified twice to main draw, however, lost in each first round.

Months later, in Venezuela F1C played on hard surface, managed to qualify to main draw. Won to Argentinian Martín Brocal 6–1, 6–3 in 1st round winning his first ATP point. After that, won to Argentinian Juan-Manuel Agasarkissian 6–3, 6–0 in 2nd round. Then, lost to Colombian Michael Quintero 3–6, 2–6 in quarterfinals..

A month later, was accepted to Ecuador F1 main draw played on hard surface. Won to ecuatorian Gonzalo Escobar 6–0, 6–2. Although, lost to Colombian Pablo González 7–6(2), 5–7, 3–6 in 2nd round. In the next week, managed to qualify to Ecuador F2 main draw, however, lost to Iván Miranda 2–6, 0–6.

Then, played four tournaments in Venezuela. In Venezuela F4 played on clay surface, lost to Jhonnatan Medina-Álvarez 2–6, 6–4, 6–7(7) in 1st round. However, in Venezuela F5 played on hard courts, won to Colombian Alejandro González 6–3, 6–4. After that, won to Jhonnatan Medina-Álvarez 7–5, 7–6(5) in 2nd round. Also, defeated Benjamin Dracos 7–5, 6–2 in quarterfinals. Then, lost to David Navarrete 0–6, 4–6 in semifinals. However, lost in first round in the other two Venezuelan tournaments.

At ending year, played two tournaments in Chile on clay surface. Lost both of them in first round. One of them to Chilean Jorge Aguilar 3–6, 6–7(5).

2007 
Began playing Panama F1 qualifying draw and managed to qualify to main draw. Lost to Argentinian Juan Pablo Amado in first round. After that, played Costa Rica F1 qualifying draw on hard surface. Lost to Canadian and eventual tourney Champ Peter Polansky 1–6, 7–6(4), 4–6.

Was selected to Peruvian Davis Cup team to play against Venezuelan Davis Cup team, in Lima, for Americas Zone Group I 1st round. Lost to Venezuelan Román Recarte 6–4, 5–7, 2–6 on clay. A month later, played the Salinas Challenger qualifying draw losing to Argentinian Gustavo Marcaccio in 1st round.

Once again was selected to Peruvian Davis Cup team to play against Mexican Davis Cup team, in Lima, for Americas Zone Group I 1st round. Lost to Venezuelan Daniel Garza 6–4, 1–6, 4–6 on clay.

He was also awarded a scholarship by the academy in Spain Sergi Bruguera. Country where he played five tournaments futures. In Spain F15 played on clay, lost to Pere Riba 2–6, 3–6 in first round. Back to America, in Mexico F11 qualifying draw played on hard surface, lost to Ryan Harrison 0–6, 3–6.

Finally, concluded his season playing Lima Challenger in which he lost to Luis Horna 0–6, 2–6 in 1st round.

2008 
Started his season playing El Salvador F1 main draw on clay in which he lost to Michael McClune 6–7(4), 6–7(2) in 2nd round. Then, played Guatemala F1 main draw on hard courts in which he lost to Nicholas Monroe 3–6, 5–7 in 2nd round.

Was selected to Peruvian Davis Cup team to play against Spanish Davis Cup team, in Lima, for World Group 1st round. Lost to Spaniard Tommy Robredo 4–6, 1–6 on clay in fourth rubber.

After that, played Colombia F4 on clay surface. There he won to Colombian Eduardo Struvay 6–1, 2–6, 7–5 in 1st round, but lost to Michael Quintero 3–6, 1–6 in 2nd round. Then, played Mexico F7 played on hard surface in which he lost to Australian and eventual tourney Champ Marinko Matosevic 6–3, 2–6, 4–6 in 2nd round.

Later, played Ecuador F1 in Quito. Won to French Fabrice Martin 2–6, 6–3, 7–6(3) in semifinals managing to play his first singles final. Lost to Ecuatorian Iván Endara 6–7(3), 3–6 in the final.

Once again was selected to Peruvian Davis Cup team to play against Israeli Davis Cup team, in Tel Aviv, for World Group Play-off. Played the doubles rubber alongside Matías Silva losing to Harel Levy and Australian Open 2008 Champ Andy Ram 1–6, 1–6, 2–6.

Finally, in his last tournament of year, Peru F5 played on clay, won to Duilio Beretta 4–6, 6–4, 6–0 in 1st round, however, lost to Argentinian Leandro Migani in 2nd round.

2009 
During off-season he trained with Luis Horna and his coach Francisco Mastelli

Started his season playing El Salvador F1 on clay courts, losing to eventual tourney champ Adam Vejmelca 6–7(3), 2–6. Then, played Guatemala F1 on hard surface in which he lost to eventual runner-up Holger Fischer 6–4, 6–7(3), 4–6. After that, played Costa Rica F1 on hard surface. Won to Christopher Díaz-Figueroa 7–5, 6–7(7), 6–3 in 1st round; won to Argentinian Juan-Manuel Valverde 6–4, 6–0 in 2nd round; won to Rylan Rizza 6–4, 6–2 in quarterfinals. Then, managed one of his best wins defeating Argentinian and Guatemala F1 champ Federico Del Bonis in semifinals. Finally, could capture his first singles title defeating Latvian Adrians Zguns 6–3, 3–6, 6–2.

Was selected to Peruvian Davis Cup team to play against Ecuatorian Davis Cup team, in Quito, for Americas Zone Group I 1st round. Played 2nd rubber against ecuatorian Nicolás Lapentti losing 2–6, 5–7, 3–6.

Once again was selected to Peruvian Davis Cup team to play against Canadian Davis Cup team, in Lima, for Americas Zone Group I Play-off, however, was not selected to play any rubber.

Then, played Venezuela F4 on hard surface. Won to Miguel Cicenia 6–4, 6–2 in 1st round; won to Román Recarte 6–1, 6–4 in 2nd round; won to Gonzalo Tur 2–6, 6–0, 6–3 in quarterfinals; won to Piero Luisi 6–3, 6–2 in semifinals. Finally, could capture his 2nd singles title defeating Mexican Luis-Manuel Flores2-6, 6–4, 7–6(4). Next week, played Venezuela F5 also on hard surface. Won to Tigre Hank 6–4, 6–3 in 1st round; won to Venezuelan David Souto 6–4, 7–6(5) in 2nd round; won to Colombian Michael Quintero 3–6, 6–2, 6–1. Finally, lost to Venezuelan Daniel Vallverdú 2–6, 3–6 in semifinals.

Also played Ecuador F2 on clay, losing to Ecuatorian Iván Endara 7–6(4), 2–6, 0–6 in semifinals. Then, played Ecuador F3 in Quito on clay. Won to Iván Endara 6–1, 3–6, 6–3 in quarterfinals and won to Marcelo Arévalo 6–4,6–4 in semifinals. Finally, lost to Argentinian Facundo Bagnis 5–7, 2–6 in the final. After that, played Colombia F5 on clay, beating 6–3, 6–4 in 1st round, however, lost to Colombian Alejandro González 3–6, 4–6 in quarterfinals.

Selected to Peruvian Davis Cup team to play against Uruguayan Davis Cup team, in Lima, for Americas Zone Group I Play-off, played 2nd rubber against Uruguayan Pablo Cuevas losing 4–6, 3–6, 2–6. Defeated Uruguayan Ariel Behar 6–2, 6–3 in fourth rubber, though.

Later, played Quito Challenger main draw in which won to Ecuatorian Juan Sebastián Vivanco in 1st round. Lost to Colombian Santiago Giraldo 4–6, 2–6 in 2nd round, though.

2010 
At the end of January, managed to go to Guatemala F1 semifinals on hard surface losing to Iván Endara 4–6, 3–6.

Then, was selected to Peruvian Davis Cup team to play against El Salvador Davis Cup team, in Lima, for Americas Zone Group II 1st round. Played 2nd rubber against Salvadorian Marcelo Arévalo winning 2–6, 6–2, 6–4, 3–6, 6–3.

At the end of April, played Manta Challenger qualifying draw in which he defeated Croatian Tomislav Perić 6–3, 7–6(4) in final round. However, lost to Kevin Kim 3–6, 3–6 in first round.

Once again was selected to Peruvian Davis Cup team to play against Venezuelan Davis Cup team, in Maracaibo, for Americas Zone Group II 2nd round. Played 1st rubber against Venezuelan David Souto losing 2–6, 4–6, 5–7.

Lost to Sebastián Decoud 3–6, 6–3, 3–6 in Colombia F1 first round on clay. Then, played Colombia F2 on clay, defeating Eduardo Struvya in 1st round and Nicolás Barrientos in 2nd round. He lost to Sebastián Decoud 3–6, 3–6 in quarterfinals. In Colombia F3 played on clay, also managed to go to semifinales in which he lost to Víctor Estrella 3–6, 4–6, previously had won to Ecuatorian Emilio Gomez 2–6, 6–4, 6–4, though.

Also, played Bolivia F1 on clay. Lost to Adam El Mihdawy por 2–6, 0–4 RET because of hand injury in semifinals.
After that, played three futures tournaments in Chile, all played on clay. In Chile F1, won against Gaston-Arturo Grimolizzi 6–2, 6–2 in quarterfinals and won to Cristóbal Saavedra-Corvalán por 6–3, 0–6, 6–3 in semifinals. In the final, lost to Chilean Guillermo Rivera-Aránguiz 2–6, 6–4, 5–7. Match in which Mauricio Echazú had had 2–6, 6–4, *5–4 serving for the match and even had had a couple of match points suffering chocking and then, lost it.

In Chile F2, lost to Sergio Galdós 2–6, 7–6(4), 4–6 in 2nd round. In Chile F3, won to Gaston Giussani 7–5, 7–6 in 2nd round and won to Argentinian Diego Alvarez 3–6, 7–6(6), 6–4 before lost to Chilean Juan Carlos Sáez 4–6, 6–2, 4–6.

Finally, played three futures tournaments in Peru, all played on clay. In Peru F1, defeated Sergio Galdós in 1st round; defeated Martín Cuevas 3–6, 7–6(9), 6–2 in quarterfinals and then, defeated Duilio Beretta 3–6, 7–6(2), 6–4 in semifinals. However, lost to Sebastián Decoud 6–7(4), 6–7(5) in the final. In Peru F2, lost to Argentinian Juan Pablo Amado 7–6(6), 6–7(5), 3–6 in semifinals, previously had defeated Argentinian Renzo Olivo 6–3, 2–6, 7–6(4) in quarterfinals, though. After that, in Peru F3, lost to Amado again 7–6(4), 1–6, 3–6, previously had won to Iván Miranda 6–2, 6–4 in quarterfinals, though.

2011 
Started to play Colombia F1 on clay, losing to Gastao Elias 1–6, 1–6. Then, played Colombia F2 on hard surface, losing to Sebastián Decoud 4–6, 4–6 in 2nd round.

Was selected to Peruvian Davis Cup team to play against Netherlands Antillean Davis Cup team, in Lima, for Americas Zone Group II 1st round. Played 2nd rubber against Netherlands Antillean Alexander Glom winning 6–2, 6–3, 7–5.

Then, played Barranquilla Challenger qualifying draw on clay. Defeated Brazilian Daniel Dutra da Silva 7–5, 2–0 RET in 1st round qualy, but lost to Denis Zivkovic in final round qualy. After that, played Pereira Challenger qualifying draw on clay. Won to Mexican Manuel Sánchez 6–4, 3–6, 7–6(3) in 1st round qualy, however, lost to Colombian Steffen Zornosa 6–1, 1–6, 5–7.

Later, played Chile F3 on clay surface in which he lost to Chilean Guillermo Hormazábal 2–6, 0–6 in semifinals. Previously, had defeated Uruguayan Marcel Felder 6–0, 6–4 in quarterfinals. A week after, played Venezuela F1 on hard surface, in which lost to Venezuelan David Souto 4–6, 6–3, 6–7(4) in the final. Previously, had defeated Venezuelan Piero Luisi 6–4, 2–0 RET.

Once again was selected to Peruvian Davis Cup team to play against Dominican Republic Davis Cup team, in Lima, for Americas Zone Group II 2nd round. Was not selected to play any rubber, though.

He was selected to Peruvian Davis Cup team to play against Paraguayan Davis Cup team, in Asunción, for Americas Zone Group II final round. Played 1st rubber against Paraguayan Daniel-Alejandro López winning 7–6(1), 7–5, 6–3 on clay. Then, played Cali Challenger main draw on clay. Lost to Argentinian Horacio Zeballos 1–6, 2–6 in first round. After that, played Venezuela F8 on hard surface, in which he lost to Canadian and eventual tournament champion Peter Polansky 5–7, 2–6 in quarterfinals. Had 2 set points at *5–4 serving for the first set, though.

Also, was selected and directly qualified to Pan American Games draw on hard courts as Peruvian athlete (tennis player). Lost to Marvin Rolle 3–6, 4–6 in first round, though. Played alongside Iván Miranda in doubles draw,  lost Nicholas Monroe and Greg Ouellette 3–6, 4–6 in first round.

After that, Mauricio Echazú competed in Buenos Aires Challenger (Copa Topper 2011) qualify draw. Won in straights sets to Argentinian Bruno Hamann 6–2, 6–4 in 1st round qualy. He then won to Argentinian Guillermo Durán 6–3, 1–6, 7–6(5) in 2nd round qualy. And finally, Echazú was defeated by Argentinian Diego Schwarztman with 3–6, 7–6(4), 6–1 score. Match in which Echazú had the upper hand for being 4–2 with a break point to serve out for the match in 2nd set. Also, he was 4–2 up in the tie-break but could not keep his cool because of making a double fault.

Finally, ended his season playing Mexico F15 and Mexico F16. In the first one, played on hard courts, defeated Mexican Bruno Rodriguez 6–4, 4–6, 7–5 in first round; then also defeated first seed Guatemalan Christopher Diaz-Figueroa 6–4, 4–6, 7–5; however, lost to eventual Champ Colombian Nicolas Barrientos 6–7(3), 2–6 in quarterfinals. In the last tournament, played on clay, lost to eventual Champ Mexican Cesar Ramirez 4–6, 5–7.

2012 
Started his season playing Bucaramanga Challenger qualifying on clay. Won to Brazilian and last runner-up tournament Fernando Romboli 7–5, 6–2 and then, won to Colombian Michael Quintero 6–4, 6–3 managing to qualify to Bucaramanga Challenger Main Draw Singles. However, lost to Chilean and 7th seed Paul Capdeville 3–6, 2–6.

Equipment, apparel, endorsements 
Echazú currently plays with a customised Babolat Pure Drive tennis racquet. He wears Adidas tennis outfit and footwear. Echazú endorses Cusqueña.

Career future finals

Singles (2)

Titles

Runners-up

Doubles (6)

Titles

Runners-up

Evolution in the ATP ranking (singles) 
Changes in the ranking ATP to the end of the season.

References

External links 
 
 
 
 Profile at the Cusqueña Tennis Team (Spanish) (update to 2006)
 News in ATPeru (Spanish) (update to August 16, 2008)

1989 births
Living people
Peruvian male tennis players
Sportspeople from Lima
Peruvian people of Spanish descent
Tennis players at the 2011 Pan American Games
Pan American Games competitors for Peru